{{Infobox settlement
|name                   =Hermel District
|settlement_type        =District 
|official_name          = ''قضاء الهرمل|nickname               = 
|motto                  =

|image_skyline          = Hermel Pyramid.jpg
|imagesize              = 
|image_caption          = Hermel Pyramid
|image_flag             = 
|flag_size              =
|image_seal             = 
|seal_size              =
|image_shield           = 
|shield_size            =
|image_blank_emblem     =
|blank_emblem_type      =
|blank_emblem_size      =
|image_map              = Lebanon districts Hermel.png
|mapsize                = 250px
|map_caption            = Location in Lebanon
|image_map1             = 
|mapsize1               = 
|map_caption1           = 
|image_dot_map          =
|dot_mapsize            =
|dot_map_caption        =
|dot_x =  |dot_y =
|pushpin_map            =  
|pushpin_label_position =bottom
|pushpin_mapsize        =300
|pushpin_map_caption    =Location in Lebanon

|subdivision_type       = Country
|subdivision_name       = 
|subdivision_type1      = Governorate
|subdivision_name1      = Baalbek-Hermel Governorate
|subdivision_type2      =Capital
|subdivision_name2      = Hermel
|subdivision_type3      = 
|subdivision_name3      = 
|subdivision_type4      = 
|subdivision_name4      =

|government_footnotes   =
|government_type        =
|leader_title           =
|leader_name            =
|leader_title1          =  
|leader_name1           =
|leader_title2          =
|leader_name2           =
|leader_title3          =
|leader_name3           =
|leader_title4          =
|leader_name4           =
|established_title      =  
|established_date       = 
|established_title2     =  
|established_date2      = 
|established_title3     =  
|established_date3      =

|area_magnitude         = 
|unit_pref                =Imperial 
|area_footnotes           =
|area_total_km2           = 731
|area_land_km2            = 
|area_water_km2           =
|area_total_sq_mi         =
|area_land_sq_mi          =
|area_water_sq_mi         =
|area_water_percent       =
|area_urban_km2           =
|area_urban_sq_mi         =
|area_metro_km2           =
|area_metro_sq_mi         =
|area_blank1_title        =
|area_blank1_km2          =
|area_blank1_sq_mi        =

|population_as_of               =
|population_footnotes           =
|population_note                =
|population_total               =48000
|population_density_km2         =66
|population_density_sq_mi       =
|population_metro               =
|population_density_metro_km2   =
|population_density_metro_sq_mi =
|population_urban               =
|population_density_urban_km2   =
|population_density_urban_sq_mi =
|population_blank1_title        =Ethnicities
|population_blank1              =
|population_blank2_title        =Religions
|population_blank2              =
|population_density_blank1_km2 =   
|population_density_blank1_sq_mi =

|timezone               = EET 
|utc_offset             = +2
|timezone_DST           = EEST 
|utc_offset_DST         = +3
|coordinates            = 
|elevation_footnotes    =  
|elevation_m            = 
|elevation_ft           =

|postal_code_type       =  
|postal_code            =
|area_code              =
|blank_name             =
|blank_info             =
|blank1_name            =
|blank1_info            =
|website                = 
|footnotes              = 
}}

The Hermel District''' is a district in the Baalbek-Hermel Governorate of Lebanon. Its population is estimated at 48,000 inhabitants, with its semi-arid land contributing to its low population density. It borders the Akkar District and Miniyeh-Danniyeh District on its west, the Baalbek District in the south and east, and Syria on its north.

Hermel descends from the highest peak in Lebanon, Qorna al-Souda, at an altitude of 3080 meters.

It is bordered by Akkar and Dannieh districts to the west, Baalbek district to the south and east, and the border with Syria to the north.

The capital of the Hermel District is Hermel.

On January 3, 2021, an explosion at a fuel storage facility in the town of Al-Qasr injured 10.

References

External links 
NY Times

 
Districts of Lebanon